Georgina Lawton (born 1992) is an Irish-Nigerian writer whose personal narrative is the subject of a non-fiction book: Raceless: In Search of Family, Identity, and the Truth About Where I Belong. Part-memoir, part-socio-political discussion, the book focuses on the construct of racial identity in the homes exploring Lawton's experience of being mixed-black in a white home with two white parents without knowing why, and discovering she was the product of a brief liaison between her mother and her birth father. Taking a DNA test after the latter died showed her to be greater than 40% Nigerian. 

A former Guardian Weekend columnist, she regularly contributes to the paper and to a number of other publications.

Birth and Childhood
Her parents, who met in London while working at a Charing Cross hotel, married in 1990. Georgina was born shortly afterwards in 1992. A midwife explained the child's dark skin as a "throwback gene" to Spanish Armada sailors shipwrecked off Ireland in the late 1500s, resulting in a darkening of bloodlines on the west coast of Ireland, notably in County Clare, where her mother was from. 

Raised as a dark child of white parents led to insecurities from not meeting European beauty standards as a teen growing up in Sutton and Carshalton, suburbs of London. The refusal to address questions about her race and denial of her mixed-race identity ultimately led to her taking a DNA test after her father's death in 2015. It confirmed that he was not her biological father, and the secret her mother had kept of a brief liaison was no longer sustainable. The revelations led to her living in communities of colour in a search for identity. Quoted in the New York Times, she said: “Ideas from our parents about who we are form the backbone of our identities, the bedrock to personal truths that we can recite and remember like prayers from church or poems from school.”

Identity quest
The disconnect Lawton felt increased as she grew older, leading to Black communities in Nicaragua's Corn Islands, Cuba, Dominicana and Brooklyn where she travelled. It was while in the Corn Islands that Lawton confronted her mother back in the UK by phone with the results of her third DNA test, showing her to be 43% Nigerian, resulting in a flat refusal by her mother to acknowledge the taboo topic of her birth. 

Currently a podcaster, Lawton previously wrote for The Guardian newspaper where she was a columnist, and also for Refinery29, VICE News, The Times, Marie Claire, Stylist, Bustle, Time Out London and others. She now lives in London, writing about travel, living, identity, and culture.

Book reception
Lawton's first book, Raceless: In Search of Family, Identity, and the Truth About Where I Belong, was published on 23 February 2021. The book has been termed "a 'must read' for racially integrated families, especially those with children" in a review on Goodreads. In a review for The New York Times, Bliss Broyard said: 'Lawton’s discussion of racial passing, transracial adoption, mixed-race identity and the health implications of being misidentified are freshly fascinating. She is a particularly astute observer of the psychological dislocation caused by growing up mixed race in a white family who never acknowledged her racial identity, and she writes beautifully about questions of identity and belonging...' 

In her book she explores the psychological dislocation which growing up had on a mixed race child whose white family ignored her racial identity, and also writes about identity and belonging, which brought about acceptance of her circumstance and relations with those she grew up around.

Further reading
 Multi-Facial
 Multiracial
 Lacey Schwartz Delgado
 Anatole Broyard
 Melungeon
 A Chosen Exile by Allyson Hobbs
 Anita Florence Hemmings
 Imitation of Life (1959 film)

References

External links 
 Raceless: In Search of Family, Identity, and the Truth About Where I Belong - Google Search

1990 births
Living people
21st-century women
People from Notting Hill